Following is a list of mayors of Lynwood, California

References

External links

Lynwood
Mayors of Lynwood, California